The 2022 DPNZ Tour was a group of 8 darts tournaments on the 2022 PDC Pro Tour, held in New Zealand, and organised by the Professional Darts Corporation's New Zealand partner, Dartplayers New Zealand.

Prize money
The prize fund for each event is NZ$2,000.

This is how the prize money is divided:

June

DPNZ Tour 1
DPNZ Tour 1 was contested on Saturday 11 June 2022 at the Papakura Club in Auckland.

DPNZ Tour 2
DPNZ Tour 2 was contested on Sunday 12 June 2022 at the Papakura Club in Auckland.

August

DPNZ Tour 3
DPNZ Tour 3 was contested on Saturday 6 August 2022 at the Black Horse Hotel in Christchurch.

DPNZ Tour 4
DPNZ Tour 4 was contested on Sunday 7 August 2022 at the Black Horse Hotel in Christchurch.

September

DPNZ Tour 5
DPNZ Tour 5 was contested on Saturday 24 September 2022 at Birkenhead RSA in Auckland.

DPNZ Tour 6
DPNZ Tour 6 was contested on Sunday 25 September 2022 at Birkenhead RSA in Auckland.

October

DPNZ Tour 7
DPNZ Tour 7 was contested on Saturday 15 October 2022 at the Dunedin Metro Club in Dunedin.

DPNZ Tour 8
DPNZ Tour 8 was contested on Sunday 16 October 2022 at the Dunedin Metro Club in Dunedin.

References

2022 in darts
2022 PDC Pro Tour